Ptychopseustis amoenella is a moth in the family Crambidae. It is found on Sulawesi.

References

Cybalomiinae
Moths described in 1855